The Governor Pack Road is a major highway in Baguio, Philippines, named for the American William F. Pack, who was appointed Military Governor of Benguet on November 15, 1901, and served as the civilian Governor of Mountain Province from 1909 to 1915.

The entire road forms part of National Route 54 (N54) and National Route 110 (N110) of the Philippine highway network.

Route description
The road connects from a roundabout of Aspiras-Palispis Highway (formerly Marcos Highway), Kennon Road, and Kisad Road to Session Road in the city's downtown core.

Landmarks
 Victory Liner Old Baguio Terminal
 Genesis Transport Bus Terminal
 Partas Bus Terminal
 Baguio General Hospital and Medical Center
 Baguio City National High School
 Baguio Tourism Complex
 University of the Cordilleras
 University of the Philippines Baguio

References

Roads in Benguet